BITU or Bitu may refer to:
 Born in the U.S.A., a 1984 album by Bruce Springsteen
 Begho
 Le petit bitu
 Bustamante Industrial Trade Union in Jamaica
 Bitu (god), the doorkeeper of the underworld in Mesopotamian mythology